Pokémon the Series: XYZ  (known in Japan as  is the nineteenth season of the Pokémon anime series, and the third and final season of Pokémon the Series: XY, known in Japan as Pocket Monsters: XY&Z (ポケットモンスター エックスワイゼット, Poketto Monsutā Ekkusu Wai Zetto). Ash, Serena, Clemont, and Bonnie continue their adventures in the Kalos region, where they encounter the sinister Team Flare and meet the enigmatic Mega Evolution Trainer, Alain. They delve into the mysteries surrounding the unique transformation of Ash's Greninja and face a prophecy concerning the destruction of Kalos with the involvement of the Legendary Pokémon Zygarde.

The season originally aired in Japan from October 29, 2015, to November 10, 2016, on TV Tokyo, and in the United States from February 20, 2016, to January 28, 2017, on Cartoon Network. 

The Japanese opening song is "XY&Z" by Satoshi / Ash Ketchum (Rika Matsumoto). The Japanese ending songs are "Puni-chan's Song" (プニちゃんのうた, Puni-chan no Uta) by Eureka / Bonnie (Mariya Ise), "Team Rocket's Team Song" (ロケット団団歌, Roketto-dan dan Uta) by Team Rocket (Musashi / Jessie (Megumi Hayashibara), Kojiro / James (Shin-ichiro Miki), Nyarth / Meowth (Inuka Inuyama) and Sonansu / Wobbuffet (Yūji Ueda)), "DreamDream (Serena Ver.)" (ドリドリ セレナ Ver., DoriDori Serena Ver.) by Serena (Mayuki Makiguchi), "Brilliantly (Clemont ver.)" (キラキラ シトロンver., KiraKira Citron ver.) by Citron / Clemont (Yuki Kaji), "Pikachu's Song" (ピカチュウのうた, Pikachū no Uta) by Pikachu (Ikue Ōtani), "Meowth's Ballad" (ニャースのバラード, Nyāsu no Barādo) by Nyarth / Meowth (Inuko Inuyama), and the English opening song is "Stand Tall" by Ben Dixon and The Sad Truth. Its instrumental version serves as the ending theme.



Episode list

Home media releases 
Viz Media and Warner Home Video have released the series in the United States on two three-disc volume sets that contain 24 episodes each.

The first volume was released on August 29, 2017, and the second was released on February 6, 2018.

Notes

References

External links 

2015 Japanese television seasons
2016 Japanese television seasons
Season19